The International Diving Educators Association (IDEA) was originally established in 1952 as part of the Florida Skin Divers Association (FSDA). FSDA is a group of politically active Florida dive clubs. FSDA has been the voice of the diver since 1952.

In the early days, Scuba Instructor training and certification was handled by the FSDA Scuba Training Committee which was also in charge of Standards & Procedures and new diver certifications. As FSDA grew, so did the Scuba Training Committee. By 1976 there were more FSDA instructors outside of Florida than within the state. Florida is home to many military bases and military personnel and with many FSDA Scuba Instructors in the military, the Scuba Training Committee began to grow internationally. As our military members transferred throughout the world, so did FSDA Scuba Instructors. In a short period of time the instructors had also spread to the Bahamas, Cayman Islands, Aruba, Jamaica, Bermuda, the Antilles and Barbados and South America. It was at this time the committee members decided that the FSDA Scuba Training Committee had outgrown FSDA.

In February of 1976, the membership voted to expand the Scuba Training Committee to an international certification agency. The name was changed and the International Diving Educators Association (IDEA) was formed. A new name, a new logo, and a new direction lead to a new “IDEA.”.
In the year 1979 IDEA was reorganized and incorporated. IDEA made its first international appearance as a member of the Diving Equipment Manufacturers
Association (DEMA) in Las Vegas in 1980. IDEA grew into over 30 foreign countries and across the continental United States. In 1996 IDEA became the fourth largest certification agency worldwide.

In 2022, with retirement looming for longtime agency head David Scoggins, IDEA passed to a new generation of divers. The new leadership is committed to building on the impressive history and heritage, while transforming IDEA to meet the challenges of the new millennium.

IDEA is proudly American owned and operated by US Military Veterans and First Responders. Other agencies may be owned in the far East, but IDEA is still based in Florida, where it all started.

IDEA and the Recreational Scuba Training Council (RSTC)
In 1987 the majority of certification agencies agreed to form a not-for-profit agency known as the Recreational Scuba Training Council (RSTC). The purpose of the RSTC is to allow member associations a vehicle for developing standards and to monitor quality control for the mutual benefit of the recreational diving industry and the general public. RSTC member agencies train over 85% of the divers certified worldwide. RSTC© USA is the parent organization of all other RSTC groups and the World Recreational Training Council, WRSTC. ISO scuba standards are based on the RSTC USA and WRSTC Standards
Founding Members of the RSTC
IDEA – International Diving Educators Association PADI – Professional Association of Diving Instructors PDIC – Professional Diving Instructors Corporation NASDS- National Association of Scuba Diving Schools SSI – Scuba Schools International
IDEA and the American National Standards Institute (ANSI)
IDEA, along with the other members of the RSTC, developed the standards for the Entry Level Scuba standards registered and approved by ANSI. The RSTC is in charge of the SCUBA Standards Committee of ANSI. IDEA scuba course standards are based on the American National Standards Institute (ANSI) Revised Instructional Standards Minimum Course Content for Entry-Level Scuba Certification as approved on September 1, 1986.§
IDEA has affiliates operating in Asia and Europe. 

IDEA Europe is a member of RSTC Europe.

Courses

Divers
IDEA offers the following diver qualifications:
 Skindiver
 Introductory Scuba 
 Basic Scuba Diver
 Open Water Diver 
Advanced Open Water Diver

Specialty qualifications
IDEA offers the following specialty courses:
Search & Recovery
Wreck Diver
Artifact Diver
Underwater Hunter & Collector
Boat Diver
Underwater Photography
Current (Swift) Water Diver
Limited Visibility Diver
Night Diver
Deep Diver
Research Diver

Star System
The Star System is a diver qualification system that is intended for use in Europe: 
 1 Star Diver which is equal to IDEA Open Water Diver plus 2 dives in the 20-25 metre depth range.
 2 Star Diver which is equal to IDEA Advanced Open Water Diver plus 2 dives in the 35-40 metre depth range.
 3 Star Diver/Advanced Deep Diver which is equal to IDEA Deep Diver, IDEA Dive Medic (or equivalent) and IDEA Rescue Diver plus 5 dives to 45 metres.

Instructors
IDEA offers the following instructional qualifications:
 Divemaster
 Assistant Instructor
 Scuba Instructor

References 

11. https://search.sunbiz.org/Inquiry/CorporationSearch

External links
 IDEA USA Official Site
 IDEA Asia homepage
 IDEA Europe homepage

Underwater diving training organizations